The All-Ireland Senior Hurling Championship 1897 was the 11th series of the All-Ireland Senior Hurling Championship, Ireland's premier hurling knock-out competition.  Limerick won the championship, beating Kilkenny 3-4 to 2-4 in the final.

Format

All-Ireland Championship

Semi-final: (1 match) This is a lone game which sees the winners of the Leinster championship play Galway who receive a bye to this stage. One team is eliminated while the winning team advances to the final.

Final: (1 match) The winners of the lone semi-final play the winners of the Munster championship.

Results

Leinster Senior Hurling Championship

Munster Senior Hurling Championship

All-Ireland Senior Hurling Championship

Championship statistics

Miscellaneous

 Limerick win the Munster championship for the first time.  It was their fourth appearance in the final.
 An All-Ireland semi-final is played for the first time since the 1887 championship.  That game is the first ever championship meeting of Galway and Kilkenny.
 The All-Ireland final is the first championship meeting of Kilkenny and Limerick.  The win gives Limerick their very first championship.
 Limerick become fifth team to win the All-Ireland hurling title.  They become the fourth team to have won an All-Ireland title in both hurling and Gaelic football.

References

Sources

 Corry, Eoghan, The GAA Book of Lists (Hodder Headline Ireland, 2005).
 Donegan, Des, The Complete Handbook of Gaelic Games (DBA Publications Limited, 2005).

1897
All-Ireland Senior Hurling Championship